Joseph Laporte (September 20, 1806 – August 19, 1862) was a farmer and political figure in Canada East. He represented Hochelaga in the Legislative Assembly of the Province of Canada from 1854 to 1861.

He was born in Pointe-aux-Trembles, the son of Charles Laporte and Josephte Christin dit Saint-Amour. Laporte was also a justice of the peace. In 1830, he married Desanges Messier. He was defeated when he ran for reelection to the assembly in 1861. Laporte died in Pointe-aux-Trembles at the age of 55.

References 
 

Members of the Legislative Assembly of the Province of Canada from Canada East
1806 births
1862 deaths
Canadian justices of the peace